The International Federation of Strength Athletes (IFSA or IFSA Strongman) was an international governing body for strongman competition. IFSA operated from 1995 to 2007 and was based in Glasgow, Scotland.

History

Origins
In 1995, David Webster, a Scotsman who later received an OBE for his services to sport and head coordinator of the World's Strongest Man from its inception, and his colleague Dr Douglas Edmunds, seven-times Scottish shot and discus champion and twice world caber champion,<ref>[http://www.heraldscotland.com/bring-on-the-war-games-1.858177 The Herald Scotland Bring on the war games DOUG GILLON, Athletics Correspondent, 19 May 2007]</ref> along with representatives from the competitors in strength athletics including Jamie Reeves, Ilkka Kinnunen and Marcel Mostert formed a governing body called the International Federation of Strength Athletes ("IFSA"). IFSA ran its own grand prix events from 1995 to 2001 in cooperation with WSM. IFSA began co-producing the Strongman Super Series events from 2001 to 2004, still in cooperation with WSM. IFSA entered an agreement with World Class Events (WCE), headed by Ulf Bengtsson, to run the Strongman Super Series. The Strongman Super Series was designed to award the annual Strongman World Championship title, but also acted as a qualifying vehicle for the World's Strongest Man contest.

Split with WSM
For almost a decade IFSA and WSM worked in full cooperation, but this changed at the end of the 2004 season when IFSA returned to organizing its own grand prix events and World Strongman Championships from 2005 to 2007. The InvestGroup Ventures' sports rights management arm, InvestGroup Sports Management, invested heavily into IFSA and this led to the creation of IFSA Strongman. The strategy was to acquire most of the international assets and properties relating to the strongman sport. In essence this was a new organization with some, such as Magnus Samuelsson describing it as "a new company...with the same name as our old federation". The attempt at dominance was not well received by TWI/WSM and disagreement ensued leading to a split in the sport. When IFSA and WSM split in 2004, the Strongman Super Series sided with TWI/WSM forming a rival federation to the IFSA. With the WSM being a TWI owned event, IFSA Holdings announced its own World Strongman    Championships for 2005, to be held in Quebec, and thus from that point had no involvement in the WSM contest. From this point, IFSA continued to organize the annual IFSA World Strongman Championships and a series of Grand Prix events throughout the year. Between 2005 and 2007 IFSA had their own version of other major events such as a rival IFSA version of Europe's Strongest Man, known as Europe's Strongest Man (IFSA).

Thus, the world of strength athletics became fragmented, with a number of individuals being able to lay claim to be the strongest in the world by virtue of having won mutually exclusive events. Athletes affiliated to IFSA Strongman were not allowed to compete in the World's Strongest Man ("WSM"), which is produced by TWI and thus neither WSM and its associated Strongman Super Series nor the IFSA circuit could claim to have a comprehensive field of the top athletes. Some events did exist that bridged the divide between the major organizations, such as the Arnold Strongman Classic and Fortissimus.

Dissolution of IFSA/birth of SCL
After the 2007 IFSA World Championships in South Korea, news began to circulate of athletes not being paid, and equipment shipping costs not being honored. IFSA eventually ended up owing $63,000 for shipping their equipment from England to South Korea and finally to Philadelphia. When the money was not paid, the equipment was put up for sale and was eventually purchased by other strongman contest promoters. The 2007 IFSA World Championships would be the final contest run solely by, and under the banner of, IFSA.

In 2008 IFSA executives Ilkka Kinnunen and Marcel Mostert developed the Strongman Champions League and negotiated with IFSA to use its athletes. However, the dissolution of IFSA meant that since the end of 2007, the Strongman Champions League still operated independent of IFSA. Gradually, the last vestiges of IFSA influence began to diminish which led to the breaking down of barriers between the various concurrent circuits. Strength athletes were able to compete in more than one circuit and did so, with a cross over of athletes between the Giants Live circuit, the Strongman Champions League and the Strongman Super Series being apparent. The 2009 World's Strongest Man was therefore anticipated by the strength athletics world as promising to be "the best one yet"'' because the organisers could ensure invites were made to "every top athlete in the world" regardless of their affiliation to any particular strength athletics body.

IFSA Strongman World Championships

2005: IFSA Strongman World Championships 
Dates: 25 September 2005
Quebec City, Canada

2006: IFSA Strongman World Championships 
Dates: 24, 25 November 2006
Reykjavik, Iceland 
This was the first year that qualifying heats were used. There were 3 heats, with the top 4 from each heat moving on to the finals.

Heat 1

Heat 2

Heat 3

Finals

2007: IFSA Strongman World Championships 
Dates: 12–15 September 2007
Geumsan, South Korea 
The 2007 competition included 6 qualifying heats, with the top 2 from each heat moving on to the finals.

Heat 1

Heat 2

Heat 3

Heat 4

Heat 5

Heat 6

Finals

Grand Prix events
All results courtesy of David Horne's World of Grip

1995

1996

1997

1998

1999

2000

2001

IFSA co-produced the Strongman Super Series events from 2001 to 2004 along with World Class Events (WCE)/Ulf Bengtsson.

2002

2003/04

2004

2005
Beginning in 2005, IFSA cut all ties with World's Strongest Man and Strongman Super Series and began hosting their own grand prix events and world championships from 2005 to 2007.

2006

2007

Strongman Champions League

Developed by Ilkka Kinnunen and Marcel Mostert, the Strongman Champions League was launched in 2008 as "a new episode in strongman". It negotiated with IFSA to use its athletes. Since the end of 2008, the Strongman Champions League still operates independently after the dissolution of IFSA:

2008

Events were planned in the following locations but cancelled: Dubai, Germany and Hungary

UK Regional Competitions

British Championships (IFSA)

UK Championship (IFSA)

IFSA England's Strongest Man

See also 
List of strongman competitions

References

External links
Official website

International sports organizations
Strength athletics organizations